Nodosome refers to protein complexes involving pattern recognition receptors and intracellular pathogen sensors NOD2 and CARD8. Their activation leads to regulation of caspase-1 and NF-kappa-B.

See also
 Inflammasome
 Innate immunity

References

Protein complexes